The International Collegiate Programming Contest, known as the ICPC, is an annual multi-tiered competitive programming competition among the universities of the world.  Directed by ICPC Executive Director and Baylor Professor Dr. William B. Poucher, the ICPC operates autonomous regional contests covering six continents culminating in a global World Finals every year. In 2018, ICPC participation included 52,709 students from 3,233 universities in 110 countries.

The ICPC operates under the auspices of the ICPC Foundation and operates under agreements with host universities and non-profits, all in accordance with the ICPC Policies and Procedures. From 1977 until 2017 ICPC was held under the auspices of ACM and was referred to as ACM-ICPC.

Mission
The ICPC, the “International Collegiate Programming Contest”, is an extra-curricular, competitive programming sport for students at universities around the world. ICPC competitions provide gifted students opportunities to interact, demonstrate, and improve their teamwork, programming, and problem-solving process. The ICPC is a global platform for academia, industry, and community to shine the spotlight on and raise the aspirations of the next generation of computing professionals as they pursue excellence. In its own words, ICPC is:

History
The ICPC traces its roots to a competition held at Texas A&M University in 1970 hosted by the Alpha Chapter of the Upsilon Pi Epsilon Computer Science Honor Society (UPE). This initial programming competition was titled First Annual Texas Collegiate Programming Championship and each University was represented by a team of up to five members. The computer used was a 360 model 65 which was one of the first machines with a DAT (Dynamic Address Translator aka "paging") system for accessing memory. The start of the competition was delayed for about 90 minutes because two of the four "memory bank" amplifiers were down. Teams that participated included, Texas A&M, Texas Tech, University of Houston, and five or six other Texas University / Colleges. There were three problems that had to be completed and the cumulative time from "start" to "successful completion" determined first-, second-, and third-place winners. The programming language used was Fortran. The programs were written on coding sheets, keypunched on Hollerith cards, and submitted for execution.  The University of Houston team won the competition completing all three problems successfully with time. The second- and third-place teams did not successfully complete all three problems. The contest evolved into its present form as a multi-tier competition in 1977, with the first finals held in conjunction with the ACM Computer Science Conference.

From 1977 to 1989, the contest included mainly teams of four from universities throughout the United States and Canada. ICPC Headquarters was hosted by Baylor University from 1989 until 2022, with regional contests established within the world's university community, the ICPC has grown into a worldwide competition. To increase access to the World Finals, teams were reduced to three students within their first five academic years.

From 1997 to 2017, International Business Machines Corporation (IBM) was the sponsor of ICPC. During that time contest participation has grown by more than 2000%. In 1997, 840 teams from 560 universities participated. In 2017, 46,381 students from 2,948 universities in 103 countries on six continents participated in regional competitions. Organized as a highly localized extra-curricular university mind sport and operating as a globally-coordinated unincorporated association operating under agreements with host universities and non-profits, the ICPC is open to qualified teams from every university in the world.

UPE has provided continuous support since 1970 and honored World Finalists since the first Finals in 1976. The ICPC is indebted to ACM member contributions and ACM assistance from 1976 to 2018. Baylor University served since 1985, hosting ICPC Headquarters from 1989 until 2022. The ICPC operates under the auspices of the ICPC Foundation which provides the ICPC Global Headquarters to service a globally-coordinated community  whose events operate under agreements with host universities and non-profits to insure that participation in ICPC is open to qualified teams from every university in the world. See ICPC Policies and Procedures.

The ICPC World Finals (The Annual World Finals of the International Collegiate Programming Contest) is the final round of competition. Over its history it has become a 4-day event held in the finest venues worldwide with 140 teams competing in the 2018 World Finals. Recent World Champion teams have been recognized by their country's head of state. In recent years, media impressions have hovered at the one billion mark.

Since 2000, only teams from Russia, China, and Poland have won the ICPC world finals, except in 2022. Participation in North America is much smaller than in the rest of the world, which is partially attributed to the perceived low payoff of participating.

Contest rules
ICPC contests are team competitions. Current rules stipulate that each team consist of three students. Participants must be university students, who have had less than five years of university education before the contest. Students who have previously competed in two World Finals or five regional competitions are ineligible to compete again.

During each contest, the teams of three are given 5 hours to solve between eight and fifteen programming problems (with eight typical for regionals and twelve for finals). They must submit solutions as programs in C, C++, Java, Ada, Python or Kotlin (although it is not guaranteed every problem is solvable in any certain language, the ICPC website states that "the judges will have solved all problems in Java and C++" for both regional and world finals competitions). Programs are then run on test data. If a program fails to give a correct answer, the team is notified and can submit another program.

The winner is the team which correctly solves the most problems. If necessary to rank teams for medals or prizes among tying teams, the placement of teams is determined by the sum of the elapsed times at each point that they submitted correct solutions plus 20 minutes for each rejected submission of a problem ultimately solved. There is no time consumed for a problem that is not solved.

Compared to other programming contests (for example, International Olympiad in Informatics), the ICPC is characterized by a large number of problems (eight or more problems in just 5 hours). Another feature is that each team can use only one computer, although teams have three students. This makes the time pressure even greater. Good teamwork and ability to withstand pressure is needed to win.

2004–2021 finals

2004 World Finals 
The 2004 ACM-ICPC World Finals were hosted at the Obecni Dum, Prague, by Czech Technical University in Prague. 3,150 teams representing 1,411 universities from 75 countries competed in elimination rounds, with 73 of those teams proceeding to the world finals. St. Petersburg Institute of Fine Mechanics and Optics from Russia won, solving 7 of 10 problems. Gold medalists were St. Petersburg Institute of Fine Mechanics and Optics, KTH - Royal Institute of Technology (Sweden), Belarusian State University, and Perm State University (Russia).

2005 World Finals

The 2005 world finals were held at Pudong Shangri-La Hotel in Shanghai on April 6, 2005, hosted by Shanghai Jiao Tong University. 4,109 teams representing 1,582 universities from 71 countries competed in elimination rounds, with 78 of those teams proceeding to the world finals. Shanghai Jiao Tong University won its second world title, with 8 of 10 problems solved.  Gold medal winners were Shanghai Jiao Tong University, Moscow State University (Russia), St. Petersburg Institute of Fine Mechanics and Optics (Russia), and University of Waterloo (Canada).

2006 World Finals
The 2006 ACM-ICPC World Finals were held in San Antonio, Texas, and hosted by Baylor University. 5,606 teams representing 1,733 universities from 84 countries competed in elimination rounds, with 83 of those teams proceeding to the world finals. Saratov State University from Russia won, solving 6 of 10 problems. Gold medal winners were Saratov, Jagiellonian University (Poland), Altai State Technical University (Russia), University of Twente (The Netherlands).

2007 World Finals
The 2007 ACM-ICPC World Finals were held at the Tokyo Bay Hilton, in Tokyo, Japan, March 12–16, 2007. The World Finals was hosted by the ACM Japan Chapter and the IBM Tokyo Research Lab. Some 6,099 teams competed on six continents at the regional level. Eighty-eight teams advanced to the World Finals. Warsaw University won its second world championship, solving 8 of 10 problems. Gold Medal Winners were Warsaw University, Tsinghua University (China), St. Petersburg Institute of Fine Mechanics and Optics (Russia), and the Massachusetts Institute of Technology (United States).  Silver Medal Winners include Shanghai Jiao Tong University (China) and 3 other universities.

2008 World Finals
The 2008 ACM-ICPC World Finals were held at the Fairmont Banff Springs Hotel, in Banff, Alberta, Canada, April 6–10, 2008.  The World Finals was hosted by the University of Alberta. There were 100 teams in the World finals, out of 6700 total teams competing in the earlier rounds. The St. Petersburg Institute of Fine Mechanics and Optics won their second world championship. Massachusetts Institute of Technology, Izhevsk State Technical University, and Lviv National University also received gold medals.

2009 World Finals
The 2009 ACM-ICPC World Finals were held in Stockholm, Sweden, April 18–22, at the campus of the hosting institution, KTH - The Royal Institute of Technology, as well as at the Grand Hotel, the Radisson Strand, and the Diplomat Hotel. There were 100 teams from over 200 regional sites competing for the World Championship. The St. Petersburg Institute of Fine Mechanics and Optics defended their title, winning their third world championship. Tsinghua University, St. Petersburg State University, and Saratov State University also received gold medals. The 2009 World Finals pioneered live video broadcasting of the entire contest, featuring elements such as expert commentary, live feeds of teams and their computer screens and interviews with judges, coaches and dignitaries. The event was broadcast online, as well as by Swedish television channel Axess TV.

2010 World Finals
The 2010 ACM-ICPC World Finals were held in Harbin, China. The host is Harbin Engineering University. Shanghai Jiao Tong University won the world championship. Moscow State University, National Taiwan University, and Taras Shevchenko Kiev National University also received gold medals.

2011 World Finals
The 2011 ACM-ICPC World Finals were held in Orlando, Florida and hosted by main sponsor IBM. The contest was initially scheduled to be held in Sharm el-Sheikh, Egypt in February, but was moved due to the political instability associated with the Arab Spring. Zhejiang University took first place with the University of Michigan at Ann Arbor, Tsinghua University, and Saint Petersburg State University taking 2nd, 3rd, and 4th respectively each receiving gold medals.
China(2G) United States(1G) Russia(1G,2S,2B) Germany(1S) Ukraine(1S) Poland(1B) Canada(1B)

2012 World Finals
The 2012 World Finals were held in Warsaw, Poland. They were inaugurated on 15 May and hosted by University of Warsaw. St. Petersburg Institute of Fine Mechanics and Optics won their fourth world championship, the most by any University at the time. University of Warsaw, Moscow Institute of Physics and Technology, and Shanghai Jiao Tong University took 2nd, 3rd, and 4th place respectively each receiving gold medals.
Russia(2G,1B) China(1G,1S) Poland(1G) United States(1S) Hong Kong(1S) Belarus(1S,1B) Canada(1B) Japan(1B)

2013 World Finals
The 2013 World Finals were held in Saint Petersburg, Russia. They were inaugurated on 3 July and were hosted by NRU ITMO.

2013 top thirteen teams that received medals are:

Japan(1G) Russia(1G,1S,2B) China(1G,1B) Taiwan(1G) Poland(1S,1B) Ukraine(1S) Belarus(1S) United States(1B)
Saint Petersburg State University of Information Technologies, Mechanics and Optics (GOLD, WORLD CHAMPION),
Shanghai Jiao Tong University (GOLD, 2nd Place),
The University of Tokyo (GOLD, 3rd Place),
National Taiwan University (GOLD, 4th Place),
St. Petersburg State University(SILVER, 5th Place),
University of Warsaw (SILVER, 6th Place),
Taras Shevchenko National University of Kyiv (SILVER, 7th Place),
Belarusian State University (SILVER, 8th Place),
Jagiellonian University in Krakow (BRONZE, 9th Place),
Moscow State University (BRONZE, 10th Place),
Carnegie Mellon University (BRONZE, 11th Place),
Tsinghua University (BRONZE, 12th Place),
Perm State University (BRONZE, 13th Place).

2014 World Finals
The 2014 World Finals were held in Ekaterinburg, Russia on June 21–25, hosted by Ural Federal University. Final competition was held on 25 June. 122 teams participated in the competition and St. Petersburg State University became the world champion.

Following teams were awarded medals in ICPC 2014:

Russia(2G,2B) China(1G,1S,1B) Taiwan(1G) Japan(1S) Poland(1S) Croatia(1S) Slovakia(1B)

Gold
St. Petersburg State University
Moscow State University
Peking University
National Taiwan University

Silver
University of Warsaw
Shanghai Jiao Tong University
The University of Tokyo
University of Zagreb

Bronze
St. Petersburg National Research University of IT, Mechanics and Optics
National Research University Higher School of Economics
Tsinghua University
Comenius University

2015 World Finals

The 2015 World Finals were held in Marrakesh (Morocco) during May 16–21, hosted by Mohammed the Fifth University, Al Akhawayn University and Mundiapolis University. Final competition was on May 20. 128 teams competed to be World Champion. Winner was Saint Petersburg ITMO, solving all the proposed problems (13) for the first time ever. Russia (2G), China (1G, 1B, 1S), Japan (1G), United States (1B, 1S), Croatia (1S), Czech Republic (1S), Korea (1B), Poland (1B).

Gold

 ITMO University
 Moscow State University
 University of Tokyo
 Tsinghua University

Silver

 Peking University
 University of California, Berkeley
 University of Zagreb
 Charles University

Bronze

 Shanghai Jiao Tong University
 Massachusetts Institute of Technology
 Korea University
 University of Warsaw

2016 World Finals
The 2016 World Finals were held in Phuket (Thailand) during May 16–21. Final competition was on May 19. 128 teams competed to be World Champion. Winner was Saint Petersburg State University solving 11 problems from 13 proposed problems. Second winner was Shanghai Jiao Tong University 7 minutes behind SpSU, also with 11 problems solved.

Gold

Saint Petersburg State University
Shanghai Jiao Tong University
Harvard University
Moscow Institute of Physics and Technology

Silver

University of Warsaw
Massachusetts Institute of Technology
St. Petersburg ITMO University
Ural Federal University

Bronze

University of Warsaw
N. I. Lobachevsky State University of Nizhny Novgorod
Lviv National University
Fudan University

2017 World Finals
The 2017 World Finals were held in Rapid City, South Dakota (United States) during May 20–25, hosted by Excellence in Computer Programming. Due to visa issue, several teams were unable to present onsite, in which the affected schools are allowed direct qualifications for ICPC 2018 besides the usual qualification spots.

The winner was ITMO University. Teams of the following countries were awarded medals in ICPC 2017: Russia (2 Gold, 1 Silver, 1 Bronze), Poland (1 Gold), South Korea (1 Gold, 1 Bronze), China (3 Silver), Sweden (1 Bronze), Japan (1 Bronze).

Gold
ITMO University
University of Warsaw
Seoul National University
Saint Petersburg State University

Silver
Moscow Institute of Physics and Technology
Tsinghua University
Peking University 
Fudan University

Bronze
KAIST
Ural Federal University
KTH Royal Institute of Technology
University of Tokyo

2018 World Finals
The 2018 World Finals were held in Beijing (China), during April 15–20, hosted by Peking University.

Gold

 Moscow State University
 Moscow Institute of Physics & Technology
 Peking University
 The University of Tokyo

Silver

 Seoul National University
 University of New South Wales
 Tsinghua University
 Shanghai Jiao Tong University

Bronze

 ITMO University
 University of Central Florida
 Massachusetts Institute of Technology
 Vilnius University
 Ural Federal University

Medals granted in the 2018 World Final 

In 2018 World Final, problems "Conquer the World" and "Uncrossed Knight's Tour" were not solved.

2019 World Finals
The 2019 World Finals were held in Porto (Portugal) from March 31 to April 5, 2019, hosted by the University of Porto and the City of Porto.

Gold

 Moscow State University
 Massachusetts Institute of Technology
 University of Tokyo
 University of Warsaw

Silver

 National Taiwan University
 University of Wroclaw
 Seoul National University
Kim Chaek University of Technology

Bronze

 Sharif University of Technology
 Moscow Institute of Physics & Technology
 National Research University Higher School of Economics
 The Chinese University of Hong Kong

2020–2021 World Finals
Because of the COVID-19 pandemic, the 2020 World Finals were postponed. It finally took place in Moscow (Russia) from October 1 to October 5, 2021, hosted by Moscow Institute of Physics and Technology.

Gold

 State University of Nizhny Novgorod
 Seoul National University
 ITMO University
 Moscow Institute of Physics and Technology

Silver

 University of Wroclaw
 University of Cambridge
 Belarusian State University
 University of Bucharest

Bronze

 Massachusetts Institute of Technology
 Kharkiv National University of Radio Electronics
 University of Illinois at Urbana-Champaign
 Higher School of Economics

Medals granted in the 2020–2021 World Finals 

In 2020–2021 World Final, problems K (Space Walls) and L (Sweep Stakes) were not solved.

2022 World Finals
The 2022 World Finals were held in Dhaka (Bangladesh), hosted by the University of Asia Pacific.

Gold

 Massachusetts Institute of Technology
 Peking University
 University of Tokyo
 Seoul National University

Silver

 ETH Zurich
 École normale supérieure (Paris)
 Carnegie Mellon University
 University of Warsaw

Bronze

 Higher School of Economics
 Saint Petersburg State University
 University of Oxford
 Hanoi University of Engineering and Technology

Winners

Renowned participants 
Some former ICPC finalists have made remarkable achievements in the software industry and research. They include Adam D'Angelo, the former CTO of Facebook and founder of Quora; Nikolai Durov, the co-founder of Telegram Messenger; Matei Zaharia, the creator of Apache Spark; Tony Hsieh, the CEO of Zappos and a venture capitalist; and Craig Silverstein, the first employee of Google.

See also 
 ACM Student Research Competition
 Competitive programming, a type of mind sport involved in programming competitions
 Online judge, a service to practice for programming contests and run them online
 PC², the Programming Contest Control System in support of Computer Programming Contest activities (used at ICPC World Finals until 2008)

References

External links
 Official Website of the ICPC.

Programming contests
Baylor University
Association for Computing Machinery